Ismael Lejarreta Arrizabalaga (born 11 June 1953) is a Spanish former racing cyclist. He rode in eight Grand Tours between 1977 and 1983.

His brother Marino (winner of the 1982 Vuelta a España) and his son Iñaki (killed in a road accident aged 29) were also professional cyclists.

References

External links

1953 births
Living people
Spanish male cyclists
People from Durangaldea
Sportspeople from Biscay
Cyclists from the Basque Country (autonomous community)